Two: Glass Apple is the second studio album by Salt Lake City, Utah-based band Melodramus, it was produced by Matt Winegar (Primus, Coheed and Cambria, Royal Bliss). The song "Black and Grey" is on the new Speed Racer soundtrack released by Sumthing Else Music Works. "Searching," and "Suffer Like You" are the first music videos from the album. Ted Newsom left the band shortly after the album was released.

Track listing
 "Down in Flames" – 3:30
 "Vapors" – 4:06
 "Frozen" – 3:24
 "Black and Gray" – 4:21
 "Searching" – 6:07
 "Generation Same" – 7:40
 "Two" – 7:01
 "Glass Apple" – 5:18
 "VHM" – 7:43
 "Suffer Like You" – 7:21

Professional reviews
GLORYDAZE Music's review of "Two: Glass Apple"
SLUG Magazine's review of "Two: Glass Apple"

Notes

External links
www.Melodramus.com
www.facebook.com/melodramus
https://www.amazon.com/dp/B0046CFPYO Two: Glass Apple on Amazon.com
http://www.cdbaby.com/cd/melodramus2 A few real people reviews
http://www.metro-music.org/shop.php?c=i&n=42&i=B0046CFPYE&x=Speed_Racer_The_Sound_Track Speed Racer Soundtrack

Melodramus albums
2010 albums